Hecatera is a moth genus in the family Noctuidae erected by Achille Guenée in 1852.

Species
 Hecatera agrapha (Boursin, 1960)
 Hecatera bicolorata (Hufnagel, 1766) – broad-barred white
 Hecatera cappa (Hübner, [1809])
 Hecatera confusa (Sugi, 1982)
 Hecatera confusa Leech, 1900
 Hecatera constantialis (Boursin, 1960)
 Hecatera corsica (Rambur, 1832)
 Hecatera deserticola (Staudinger, 1879)
 Hecatera digramme (Fischer von Waldheim, 1820)
 Hecatera disjuncta Hacker & Fibiger, 1999
 Hecatera dysodea (Denis & Schiffermüller, 1775) – small ranunculus
 Hecatera filipjevi (Draudt, 1934)
 Hecatera fixseni (Christoph, 1882)
 Hecatera maderae (Bethune-Baker, 1891)
 Hecatera mirabilis (Staudinger, 1888)
 Hecatera rhodocharis (Brandt, 1938)
 Hecatera weissi (Draudt, 1934)

External links

 
Hadenini